The Gardener is Child ballad 219 (Roud 339); also called "Proud Maisrie" or "The Gardener Child", the collection includes several variants, many fragmentary.

Synopsis
A gardener woos a lady, proposing to dress her in various flowers.  She rejects him with a suggestion that he wear snow and other wintry weather.

References

External links
The Gardener
The Gardener, in Kinloch, 'Ancient Scottish Ballads', 1827

Child Ballads
Year of song unknown
Songwriter unknown